Taissy is a commune in the Marne department in north-eastern France.

Population

See also
Communes of the Marne department

References

Communes of Marne (department)